Hans Burn is a Swiss para-alpine skier. He represented Switzerland at the Winter Paralympics in 1988, 1992, 1994, 1998, 2002 and 2006. In total he won six gold medals, five silver medals and three bronze medals.

Achievements

See also 
 List of Paralympic medalists in alpine skiing

References 

Living people
Year of birth missing (living people)
Place of birth missing (living people)
Paralympic alpine skiers of Switzerland
Alpine skiers at the 1988 Winter Paralympics
Alpine skiers at the 1992 Winter Paralympics
Alpine skiers at the 1994 Winter Paralympics
Alpine skiers at the 1998 Winter Paralympics
Alpine skiers at the 2002 Winter Paralympics
Alpine skiers at the 2006 Winter Paralympics
Medalists at the 1988 Winter Paralympics
Medalists at the 1992 Winter Paralympics
Medalists at the 1994 Winter Paralympics
Medalists at the 1998 Winter Paralympics
Medalists at the 2002 Winter Paralympics
Medalists at the 2006 Winter Paralympics
Paralympic gold medalists for Switzerland
Paralympic silver medalists for Switzerland
Paralympic bronze medalists for Switzerland
Paralympic medalists in alpine skiing